The Kenya Army Band is the primary military musical unit in the Kenya Army and the Kenya Defence Forces. The band was founded shortly after Kenya gained its independence from the United Kingdom in 1963 as the successor the Band of King's African Rifles of East Africa (formed in 1930). It is present at all national celebrations including Jamhuri Day, Heroes' Day and Remembrance Day. All members of the band are aged between 18–26 at the time of enlistment with the band and it takes 5 years before a musician is qualified to perform with the band, which is currently based out of the Lang'ata Army Barracks near Nairobi. The barracks are also home to another of the band's institutions, the Kenya Army School of Music.

All members of the band come from the 8 battalions in the Infantry Branch, with many having been deployed to Somalia and Sudan on peacekeeping missions. The band wears a distinctive white and black monkey bearskin, which has a pattern based on the one that is used by the Royal Scots Dragoon Guards of the British Army. The SCOTS DG bearskin was originally a gift to the Scots from Tsar Nicholas II of Russia while he was Colonel of the Regiment.

Events
The band performs at a range of events including:

Public holidays
Madaraka Day
Moi Day
Mashujaa Day (formerly Kenyatta Day)
Jamhuri Day
Commemorations
Remembrance Day Services
Beating Retreats and Sunset Ceremonies
Military Tattoos
Military Parades

In 1980, the band took part in the centenary of the Royal Tournament.

Jamhuri Day
The Trooping of the Colour of the Kenya Defence Forces takes place every Jamhuri Day. During the ceremony, the band plays a slow march followed by a quick march with the lone drummer then breaking away to take his position beside number one guard to play the drummers call, signalling the officers of No.1 Guard to take positions to receive the colour. As part of the massed KDF band, the army band performs the chosen Kenyan tunes for the parade. After the first verse of the Ee Mungu Nguvu Yetu is played, the band performs the tune of the British grenadier guards during the trooping followed by the first tune of the parade that is always By land and sea.

State opening of parliament and state visits
The two main events the band participates in where a guard of honour from the Kenya Army Infantry is mounted include state visits and the State Opening of Parliament. For the former, the band performs the national anthems of both the visiting country and Kenya. The band then plays a slow march during the inspection of the guard and martial music for a pass-out parade for the guest of honour. During the opening of parliament, the band performs the general salute for the President of Kenya, who then undergoes a similar procedure to visiting dignitaries during state visits, with the band performing the same protocol music (save for the martial music).

Notable members
Lieutenant Colonel Simon Tipatet, a longtime director of the band.
Lieutenant Colonel Martin Makadia, the Senior Director of Music and a graduate of the Royal Military School of Music at Kneller Hall.
Lieutenant Colonel Nicholas Wasomi was the former director of the band. He was a recipient of the Moran of the Order of the Burning Spear. He died in November 2019 in Nairobi.
Ken Makokha

See also
 Kenya Navy Band
 Maroon Commandos

Sources

Kenyan military bands
Kenyan musical groups
1963 establishments in Kenya
Military units and formations established in 1963
Musical groups established in 1963